Bullcroft Main Colliery F.C. was an English association football club based in Carcroft, Doncaster, South Yorkshire.

History
Little is known of the club other than that it competed in the FA Cup in the 1910s and 1920s.

Records
Best FA Cup performance: 3rd Qualifying Round, 1923–24

References

Defunct football clubs in South Yorkshire
Doncaster & District Senior League
Yorkshire Football League
Defunct football clubs in England
Mining association football teams in England